The Dewoitine P-4 was a glider designed by Émile Dewoitine and built by Constructions Aéronautiques Émile Dewoitine in the early 1920s.

Specifications (P-4)

References

Further reading

External links
 Planeurs.net Dewoitine P-4

P-4
1920s French sailplanes
Aircraft first flown in 1923
Glider aircraft